Parker Kindred is an American drummer who played in the band of Jeff Buckley, appearing on his unfinished second album,  Sketches for My Sweetheart the Drunk in 1997, as well as playing live with Buckley and the rest of his band at Arlene's Grocery on February 9, 1997. Kindred was introduced to Buckley through Mick Grøndahl, then Buckley's bassist, as a permanent replacement for Eric Eidel after mainstay drummer Matt Johnson left the band at the end of the Australian leg of the tour.

After Buckley's death Kindred continued to work with the other band members on other projects in New York City. Kindred, with Michael Tighe and Buckley's then-girlfriend, Joan Wasser, formed Black Beetle. Shortly after Wasser embarked on a solo career and the band split up. However Tighe and Kindred continued to play together and later went on to form The A.M. with bassist Andrew Wyatt. Their debut self-titled LP was released in 2003 by Storm Music.

Since then he has worked with numerous other artists including Antony and the Johnsons, Joan As Police Woman, Amen Dunes, Cass McCombs, Minor Alps, Luke Temple , Adam Green, Grand Mal, White Bike and Mike Bones.

The UK's best-selling drum magazine Rhythm featured a two-page article on Kindred in January 2009.

References

External links
 Antony and the Johnsons: Parker Kindred

American drummers
Living people
Antony and the Johnsons members
The A.M. members
Year of birth missing (living people)